The 2013 South Florida Bulls football team represented the University of South Florida (USF) in the 2013 NCAA Division I FBS football season.  The Bulls played their home games at Raymond James Stadium in Tampa, Florida. The 2013 college football season was the 17th season overall for the Bulls, and their first season as a member of the American Athletic Conference. They were led by first year head coach Willie Taggart after USF fired Skip Holtz at the conclusion of the 2012 season. This season followed a season that saw the Bulls win their fewest games in program history (3). They broke that record by only winning 2 games in 2013, finishing 2–10, 2–6 in American Athletic play to finish in eighth place.

Schedule

References

South Florida
South Florida Bulls football seasons
South Florida Bulls football